Abhiyum Naanum is a 2008 Indian Tamil-language comedy drama film produced by Prakash Raj and directed by Radha Mohan. It features Prakash Raj in the central character with Trisha in the lead role as his daughter, while Aishwarya and Ganesh Venkatraman play supporting roles. The film is based on the English film Father of the Bride. The film was partially reshot in Telugu as Aakasamantha with Jagapathi Babu replacing Prithviraj, which released in 2009.

Vidyasagar scored the music for the film. The film was launched in October 2007 and released on 19 December 2008. The film opened to critical acclaim and won several awards, including the ITFA Best Movie Award. The plot and scenes were reported to be similar to the 1991 movie Father of the Bride. The film was remade in Kannada as Naanu Nanna Kanasu (2010).

Plot
Raghuraman is a simple man who manages estates and doing his own business in Ooty. He meets Sudhakar, a newcomer at Coonoor, who has a young daughter. Raghuram sees the father and daughter duo, and smiles thinking of his own daughter. He engages in a conversation with Sudhakar. Raghuram married his cousin Anu without their parents' consent. They have a daughter Abhi, whom Raghuram loves so much. Abhi is the world to him. Raghuram narrates his story with Sudhakar. Raghuram does anything for Abhi and usually gets into quarrels with his wife, who has a different way of raising the child.

As year rolls by, Abhi grows up and her parents are happy with whatever she does. She even brings in a beggar, Ravi 'Shashtri', and he lives with them, considering Abhi as his mother. Raghuram's close friend, Dhamu, does not have any kids and considers Abhi as their own daughter as well. When Abhi tells her parents that she wants to study in Delhi, Raghuram throws a tantrum. Eventually, Abhi is able to convince Raghuram. Even though he is sad when thinking about spending two years without Abhi, he moves on. Raghuram is elated when she comes back but gets a shock. Abhi tells her parents that she fell in love with a man. Anu is totally fine with it, but Raghuram is not. He gets angry and scared and does not talk to Abhi and Anu properly. When Anu tells him that the man is coming from Delhi, Raghuram tries to be fine. Once again, he gets shocked when he realizes that the man is actually a Sikh, named Joginder Singh. He thereafter maintains distance from Jogi and is cautious not to hurt Abhi.

Raghuram gets amazed when he sees Jogi on TV with the Prime Minister and gets slightly impressed. However, his relationship with Jogi remains the same. One day when a large group of people, whom Raghuram assumes to be Jogi's relatives, turn up at his house, he gets frustrated. He vents his anger to Anu, which Abhi hears and gets hurt. Raghuram surprisingly does not console Abhi as he is upset with her as well. But soon, they both reconcile when Raghuram realises that Abhi would be happy with the man she loves. Raghuram learns from Abhi that the people are not relatives of Jogi but just a group of broken people whom Jogi is taking care of. She tells the story of some people, and Raghuram feels proud of Jogi. He gets happy and without knowing how to show his happiness, he shouts and screams, causing people to think he has gone mad. Raghuram happily tells Anu that he is perfectly fine with the wedding. Meanwhile, Ravi and one of the orphans, Jasvinder Kaur, fall in love. Abhi and Jogi get married with Raghuram and Anu's blessing. During their reception, Ravi pours his heart out about his 'mother' Abhi. Dhamu and his wife declare that they are going to adopt a child and thank Jogi for that. Raghuram surprises Anu by inviting her parents for the reception and everyone is happy.

The next day at the airport, Abhi and her parents bid an emotional goodbye to each other. Abhi cries on her father's shoulder but Raghuram does not shed a single tear. He happily sends Abhi with Jogi and walks out of the airport. He suddenly laughs hysterically, much to Ravi and Anu's shock. In the present, where Raghuram brings Sudhakar to his home. Ravi had married Jasvinder Kaur. Raghuram tells Sudhakar that daughters are the sweetest blessings from God and they should be proud parents. He also warns him that time flies by real quickly and that he has to enjoy the maximum with his daughter. When they get a call from Abhi from Delhi, everyone leaves Sudhakar alone in the room with his daughter. Sudhakar turns to his daughter and smiles happily at her, which she returns.

Cast

 Prakash Raj as Raghuraman
 Trisha as Abhi 
 Aishwarya as Anu 
 Ganesh Venkatram as Joginder Singh
 Thalaivasal Vijay as Dhamu
 Sriranjini as Dhamu's wife
 Manobala as Varatharajan
 Kumaravel as Ravi Shastri
 Manmeet Singh as Veerji
 Jayashri as Jasvinder Kaur
 Geetha Ravishankar as the school principal
 Chaams as a man at the school admissions interview
 Prithviraj as Sudhakar (special appearance)
 Jagapati Babu as Sudhakar (in Telugu; special appearance)

Production
After the success of Mozhi (2007), Moser Baer who released the DVD of Mozhi under their company collaborated with Duet Movies and launched three projects on 2007 with Abhiyum Naanum being one of them.

Soundtrack

The songs and background music have been composed by Vidyasagar, with lyrics written by Vairamuthu.

Release
The Tamil version released on 19 December 2008 The satellite rights of the Tamil version were sold to Kalaignar.

Critical reception
Abhiyum Naanum received high positive reviews from critics. Pavithra Srinivasan of Rediff said, "For fathers who love their daughters, this is your pick. Definitely worth a watch." and rated the film 3 out of 5. IndiaGlitz said, "Though the story unfolds in a slow pace towards the climax and there are few scenes which reminds one of watching a soap show, Abhiyum Nanum stands out for it is a quality entertainer which can be watched by the whole family". Malathi Rangarajan of The Hindu said, "Watch it for its natural treatment". Sify said, "Frankly speaking, the Prakash Raj- Radha Mohan combo's Abhiyum Naanum is nowhere in the league of their previous oeuvre Mozhi. With a touching title like that, one would have thought the director would have a more solid script, but somehow it fails to strike a chord like their earlier film." but added that "If you are still looking for a different kind of cinematic experience, then, it’s worth a look." Behindwoods rated the film 2 out of 5, saying "Abhiyum Naanum – sparkles in bits and pieces" and that it was "likely to suffer commercially".

Awards and nominations

References

External links
 

2008 films
Father of the Bride (franchise)
Films shot in Ooty
Tamil films remade in other languages
Films scored by Vidyasagar
2000s Tamil-language films
Indian comedy-drama films
2008 comedy-drama films
Films directed by Radha Mohan
Telugu language
2000s Telugu-language films
Indian multilingual films